Lake Bruce is an unincorporated community in Union Township, Fulton County, Indiana (and partially in Pulaski County). It was named after the 245-acre lake nearby.

Geography

References

Unincorporated communities in Fulton County, Indiana
Unincorporated communities in Indiana